Mornings with GMA Regional TV is a 2020 Philippine television morning news broadcasting show broadcast by GMA Dagupan and GMA Ilocos. Originally hosted by Ara Hanesh and Ralph Guieb (later Angelica Maglanoc), it premiered on September 28, 2020. Joanne Ponsoy and Harold Reyes are currently hosts.

Overview
The program is the first unified morning show in North Central Luzon, more than five years after its predecessor Primera Balita, airing on GMA Dagupan, went off the air following the strategic streamlining of programs and manpower on GMA's provincial stations.

Mornings with GMA Regional TV broadcasts live from the GMA Dagupan Station and is simulcast in GMA Ilocos Norte (Channel 5), GMA Ilocos Sur (Channel 48), GMA Abra (Channel 7), GMA Mountain Province (Channel 5), GMA Aparri (Channel 13), GMA Tuguegarao (Channel 7), GMA Batanes (Channel 7), GMA Isabela (Channel 7), GMA Baler (Channel 5), GMA Olongapo (Channel 10), GMA Naga (Channel 7), GMA Legazpi (Channel 12), GMA Catanduanes (Channel 13), GMA Sorsogon (Channel 2), GMA Daet (Channel 8) and GMA Masbate (Channel 7).

Less than a month later, Ralph Guieb left the program leaving Ara Hanesh as solo anchor of the program. Eight months later, Harold Reyes was announced as the new co-host of Hanesh, although the latter had her last appearance on December 17, 2021. Co-host Angelica Maglanoc joined Reyes on January 3, 2022 and stayed until April that same year. 

On February 6, 2023, the program shifted from a pre-recorded presentation to live broadcasts as part of the rebranding of GMA Regional TV, integrating news reports alongside interviews with personalities all over North Central Luzon and expanding its coverage area to include the Southern Tagalog and Bicol regions. Co-host and correspondent Joanne Ponsoy joined the show as part of this change.

Segments
 BizTalk
 Business Matters
 Globalita
 Bantay Presyo
 GMA Integrated News Weather Center
 Mangan Tila
 Alam Mo Ba?
 Mangan Tila Express
 #MorningFeels
 Pampa-Good Vibes
 Spotlight
 Unang Balita

Hosts
 Harold Reyes (since 2021, GMA Dagupan)
 Joanne Ponsoy (since 2023, GMA Dagupan)

Former
 Ralph Guieb (2020, GMA Dagupan)
 Ara Hanesh (2020-2021, GMA Dagupan, now in the United States)
 Angelica Maglanoc (2021 - 2022, GMA Ilocos)
 CJ Torida (2022 - 2023, GMA Dagupan)

References

2020 Philippine television series debuts
GMA Network news shows
GMA Integrated News and Public Affairs shows
Philippine television news shows